Haji Hassan Khan was Nawab of Masulipatam. He was second son of Nawab Muhammad Taqi Khan Bahadur who in turn was Nawab of Masulipatam.

Official name
His official name was Nizam ud-Daula, Nawab Hasan Ali Khan Bahadur, Nawab of Masulipatam.

Life
He entered the Nizam's service and appointed to a large mansab. A firman from him authorized the French Representative Fouquet, then chief of the Company at Machilipatnam to set up a loge at Yanaon in the year 1731.

He became faujdar of the Northern Circars between 1758 and 1765. Finally he surrendered the government to the HEIC in return for a substantial pension and jagirs. He was greatest of all nawabs of masulipatam.

Death
He died at Masulipatam in 1771.

Titles held

* He ascended throne sometime before 1731.

See also
Nawab of Carnatic
Nawab of Banganapalle

References

Nawabs of India
French India
Yanam
1771 deaths
Year of birth unknown
Mughal Empire